Jaskaur Meena (born 3 May 1947) is an Indian politician, a former Union minister of state in Government of India and a leader of Bharatiya Janata Party. She was also in charge of the Scheduled tribes (ST) Morcha (wing) of the party at the national level.

Early life
She was born in 1947 in Sangaroor, Punjab but her family migrated to Rajasthan when she was very young. She has a BEd and a master's degree from the University of Rajasthan. She is known to be the first female literate political leader in her community. She served as a teacher and educational administrator in the Women and Child Development Department, Government of Rajasthan. She belongs to the community of  Meenas in Rajasthan.

Positions held 

1999: Elected to 13th Lok Sabha (lower house) from Sawai Madhopur constituency.
2003–2004:  Union Minister of State, Ministry of Human Resource Development
2019: Elected as a Member of Parliament from Dausa constituency.
2021: Nominated as BJP's National Executive Council Member from Rajasthan.
2019: Member Standing Committee for Indian Railways.

Social activism 
Jaskaur set up a Gramin Mahila Vidyapeeth (Rural Girls' University) in the village of Mainpura in Sawai Madhopur District in 1993 to educate girls in the district. The Vidyapeeth includes girls in grades 1 through 12. It was constructed with the active participation of 4,000 families. She also owns her own dairy farm called 'Shabri'.

Books published 
Inhen Bhi Jaaniye – containing detailed description of national signs and symbols
Samay Ki Ret – a compilation of poems
Geet Sangrah – a collection of folk songs of Rajasthan recited on auspicious occasions
Mahila Ke Badhate Charan

External links
Parliament of India biographical data

References

Bharatiya Janata Party politicians from Rajasthan
Living people
1947 births
Rajasthani people
Indian schoolteachers
University of Rajasthan alumni
Women in Rajasthan politics
People from Sawai Madhopur district
People from Dausa district
India MPs 1999–2004
Lok Sabha members from Rajasthan
Educators from Rajasthan
21st-century Indian women politicians
21st-century Indian politicians
20th-century Indian women politicians
20th-century Indian politicians
Women educators from Rajasthan
India MPs 2019–present
Women members of the Lok Sabha
Meena people